Jonathan Pugh (born 1962) is an English cartoonist who has contributed to many United Kingdom national newspapers and magazines.

Early life 
Pugh was born in Worcester, England. He was educated at Whitford Hall in Bromsgrove (Worcestershire), the Dragon School in Oxford, and Downside School near Bath (Somerset). He studied law at Oxford Polytechnic (now Oxford Brookes University).

Work 
Pugh has been the pocket cartoonist for The Times. He has also worked for The Guardian, The Independent, The Observer, Punch, Private Eye, The Spectator, Country Life, and The Tablet. His work covers editorial and topical subject matter, including political and social comment. His cartoons include gag cartoons and comic strips. He has also undertaken book illustration and advertising work. In January 2010, Pugh became the pocket cartoonist for the Daily Mail.

Books 
 Howard, Philip, and Pugh, Jonathan, The Times Quotes of the Week. HarperCollins UK, 2002. .
 Pugh, Jonathan, Best of Pugh. Virgin Paperbacks, 2007. .

See also 
 List of editorial cartoonists

References

External links 
 Pugh Cartoons website

1962 births
Living people
Artists from Worcester, England
People educated at The Dragon School
People educated at Downside School
Alumni of Oxford Brookes University
English cartoonists
British editorial cartoonists
Punch (magazine) cartoonists